Barnaby House is a historic home in Oxford, Talbot County, Maryland, United States.  It is a -story, side-hall / double-pile frame house erected in 1770.  It features a steeply pitched wood shingle roof marked by two shed-roofed dormers and a single-story brick-ended kitchen wing.  It is one of only three 18th-century buildings remaining in Oxford.

Barnaby House was listed on the National Register of Historic Places in 1992.

References

External links
, including undated photo, at Maryland Historical Trust

Houses on the National Register of Historic Places in Maryland
Houses in Talbot County, Maryland
Houses completed in 1770
National Register of Historic Places in Talbot County, Maryland
1770 establishments in Maryland